The women's 10,000 metres at the 2012 European Athletics Championships was held at the Helsinki Olympic Stadium on 1 July.

Medalists

Records

Schedule

Results

Final

References

 Final Results

10000 W
10,000 metres at the European Athletics Championships
Marathons in Finland
2012 in women's athletics